Argentina
 Cervantes Theatre, in Buenos Aires;
  Spain
 Cervantes Theatre, in Almeria;
 Cervantes Theatre,  in Alcalá de Henares;
 Cervantes Theatre, in  Béjar;
 Cervantes Theatre, in Jaén;
 Cervantes Theatre, in Málaga;
 Cervantes Theatre, in Murcia;
 Cervantes Theatre, in Segovia;
 Cervantes Theatre, in Valladolid;
  Morocco
 Cervantes Theatre, in Tangier;
  Mexico
 Cervantes Theatre, in Guanajuato